Nathan Udell Miller (born October 8, 1971) is a former American football offensive guard who played three seasons with the Atlanta Falcons and one season with the  New York Giants of the National Football League (NFL). He played college football at Louisiana State University and attended Central High School in Tuscaloosa, Alabama. He was also a member of the Frankfurt Galaxy, New York Giants and Los Angeles Xtreme.

College career
Miller played four years for the LSU Tigers, starting 29 of 37 games. He recorded 101 tackles, two forced fumbles, 11 tackles for loss, and two sacks in his college career.

Professional career
Miller was a member of the NFL's Atlanta Falcons from 1995 to 1998. He played in 13 games for the Falcons in 1997. He played for the Frankfurt Galaxy of the World League of American Football during the 1997 season. Miller was a member of the New York Giants of the NFL from 1998 to 1999. He was released by the Giants prior to the start of the 1999 season. He played for the Los Angeles Xtreme of the XFL in 2001.

References

External links
Just Sports Stats

Living people
1971 births
American football offensive guards
African-American players of American football
LSU Tigers football players
Atlanta Falcons players
Frankfurt Galaxy players
New York Giants players
Los Angeles Xtreme players
Players of American football from Alabama
Sportspeople from Tuscaloosa, Alabama
21st-century African-American sportspeople
20th-century African-American sportspeople